Cuenta Conmigo (Count On Me) is Jerry Rivera's third and most successful album. It is considered one of the most important albums in his career. It is positioned as one of the best sellers of salsa history, and has even been compared to Siembra of Willie Colon and Ruben Blades. The album was awarded "Tropical Album of the Year" at the Lo Nuestro Awards of 1993.

Track listing
 Casi Un Hechizo - 4:35
 Amores Como el Nuestro - 5:02
 A Ti Mi Nena - 4:38
 Me Estoy Muriendo de Amor - 4:54
 El Príncipe de la Ciudad - 4:37
 Una En Un Millón - 4:59
 Amor de Colegio - 4:28
 Chiquilla - 4:59
 Cuenta Conmigo - 5:03
 Me Estoy Enamorando - 4:47

Chart position 
Album

Singles

Certification

See also
List of number-one Billboard Tropical Albums from the 1990s

References

1992 albums
Jerry Rivera albums
Sony Discos albums